Anatoly Ustinovich Konstantinov (12 June 1923 – 22 October 2006) was a senior military officer who served as commander of the Moscow Air Defence District from 1980 to 1987. During World War II, he was a fighter pilot and a flying ace for which he was awarded the title Hero of the Soviet Union.

Early life
Konstantinov was born in 1923 into a working-class family of Russian ethnicity. He graduated from nine classes of high school and later joined a flying club.

Military career
In 1940, he was called up for military service on a Komsomol ticket to the Red Army. He graduated from the Tbilisi Military Aviation School of Pilots in 1941 and was assigned to 8th Reserve Fighter Aviation Regiment near Saratov.

World War II
Konstantinov took part in the battles at the Eastern Front from August 1941. He served as a pilot, flight commander and commander of a fighter squadron in the 85th Guards Fighter Aviation Regiment, and flew missions mostly in the Yak-1, Yak-9 and Yak-3. He took part in the Battle of Stalingrad and Crimean offensive, and in liberation of Poland, Romania, Czechoslovakia, Hungary and Austria, while assigned to the Southern, 1st Ukrainian, 2nd Ukrainian and 4th Ukrainian Fronts. He joined the Communist Party of the Soviet Union in 1943. He flew escort missions for Il-2 attack aircraft, which, under his cover, had suffered no losses from enemy aircraft.

By February 1945, he flew 294 sorties and took part in 90 air battles, where he personally shot down 19 enemy aircraft. For these exploits, he was presented for the title of Hero of the Soviet Union. The corresponding decree of the Presidium of the Supreme Soviet of the USSR was signed only on 15 May 1946.

He continued to fly missions until V-E Day. By the end of the war, he flew 327 sorties and took part in 96 air battles, and personally shot down 22 enemy aircraft. He was wounded several times and once managed to make an emergency landing of his damaged aircraft.

Post war
After the war, he served as commander of an aviation squadron and deputy commander of a fighter aviation regiment. From November 1952, he commanded a fighter aviation regiment and from February 1956, he was appointed as deputy commander and from March 1957, commander of a fighter aviation division in the Air Force.

In April 1958, he was transferred to the Soviet Air Defence Forces, where he also became the commander of an aviation division. In 1964 he graduated from the Military Academy of the General Staff and from 1968, he commanded an air defense corps.

In December 1970, he was appointed as commander of the 11th Separate Red Banner Air Defense Army in Khabarovsk and from 1973, he commanded the Baku Air Defence District and in 1980, he was appointed as commander of the Moscow Air Defence District. In 1982, he graduated from the higher academic courses at the Military Academy of the General Staff and was awarded the military rank of Marshal of Aviation on 30 April 1985. In 1987, he, Soviet Minister of Defense Sergey Sokolov and hundreds of other officers were dismissed by Mikhail Gorbachev as a result of the Mathias Rust affair.

From 1987 till the dissolution of the Soviet Union in 1991, he served as the military inspector and adviser of the Group of Inspectors General of the USSR Ministry of Defense. He retired from military service in May 1992.

Konstantinov was a member of the Central Auditing Commission of the CPSU from 1981 to 1986, candidate member of the Central Committee of the CPSU from 1986 to 1989 and deputy from Ryazan Oblast at the Soviet of the Union during 9th to 11th convocations from 1974 to 1989.

Later life
In the last years of his life, he served as an adviser to the commander of the Special Purpose Command of the Russian Air Force.

Konstantinov died on 22 October 2006, at the age of 83. He was buried at the Troyekurovskoye Cemetery.

Awards and decorations
USSR and Russia

jubilee medals
Honorary citizen of Sevastopol

Foreign

Honorary citizen of Židlochovice (Czech Republic)

References 

1923 births
2006 deaths
Heroes of the Soviet Union
Recipients of the Order of the Red Banner
Recipients of the Order of Alexander Nevsky
Recipients of the Order of the Red Star
Recipients of the Order of Lenin
Recipients of the Order "For Merit to the Fatherland", 4th class
Recipients of the Medal of Zhukov
Recipients of the Order "For Service to the Homeland in the Armed Forces of the USSR", 3rd class
Recipients of the Medal "For Distinction in Guarding the State Border of the USSR"
Recipients of the Silver Cross of Merit (Poland)
Military personnel from Moscow
Soviet military personnel of World War II
Russian people of World War II
Soviet World War II flying aces
Soviet Air Force marshals
Ninth convocation members of the Soviet of the Union
Tenth convocation members of the Soviet of the Union
Eleventh convocation members of the Soviet of the Union
Burials in Troyekurovskoye Cemetery
Communist Party of the Soviet Union members
Military Academy of the General Staff of the Armed Forces of the Soviet Union alumni
Soviet Air Defence Force officers